Hany Ouichou is a Canadian film producer. The president of the film studio Art & Essai, he is most noted as the producer of Those Who Make Revolution Halfway Only Dig Their Own Graves (Ceux qui font les révolutions à moitié n'ont fait que se creuser un tombeau), which was a Canadian Screen Award nominee for Best Picture at the 5th Canadian Screen Awards in 2017, and Mutants, which won the Canadian Screen Award for Best Live Action Short Drama at the same ceremony.

His other credits include the films Wild Skin  (La Peau sauvage), which was also a CSA nominee for Live Action Short Drama in 2017, and Prank.

References

External links

Film producers from Quebec
Living people
Year of birth missing (living people)